Stenia Liliane Michel (born 23 October 1987) is a Swiss footballer who last played as a goalkeeper for FC Basel of the Swiss Nationalliga A. She previously played for FF USV Jena of the German Bundesliga, and FC Zürich of Switzerland's Nationalliga A, who were known as SV Seebach until 2008. Michel has been a member of the Switzerland national team since 2005, but did not make her debut until March 2014, a 1–1 draw with South Korea at the 2014 Cyprus Cup.

Michel became Switzerland's first-choice goalkeeper in the run up to the 2015 FIFA Women's World Cup, because rival Gaëlle Thalmann had suffered an anterior cruciate ligament injury.

References

External links

 
 

1987 births
Living people
Swiss women's footballers
FF USV Jena players
Expatriate women's footballers in Germany
Swiss expatriate sportspeople in Germany
Swiss expatriate women's footballers
People from Zürich District
Switzerland women's international footballers
Women's association football goalkeepers
FC Zürich Frauen players
Swiss Women's Super League players
People from Uster
FC Basel Frauen players
2015 FIFA Women's World Cup players
Frauen-Bundesliga players
Sportspeople from the canton of Zürich
UEFA Women's Euro 2017 players